Raw, Uncut and X-Rated is the third studio album by American Oakland-based rapper Too Short. It was released via 75 Girls Records.

Track listing

Notes
 "She's A Bitch" sampled "Funk It Up '85" by The Sequence
 "The Bitch Sucks Dick" sampled "Mosquito" by West Street Mob
 "Short Side/Blow Job Betty" sampled "Rappin' Duke" by Rappin' Duke

Personnel
Todd Anthony Shaw - vocals
Dean Hodges - producer

References

Too Short albums
1986 albums